Elof Lars "Thore" Skogman (9 March 1931 – 9 December 2007) was a popular Swedish singer, songwriter, actor and entertainer.

Skogman was born in Hallstahammar, Sweden. While working as an accountant and sales manager during the 1950s, he made his debut recording in 1955, devoted his full-time to singing by 1961, and came third in Sweden's national song contest Melodifestivalen in 1963. In the 1960s he wrote "Fröken Fräken" (literally: Miss Freckle) that became one of his most successful hits. Skogman also wrote songs for other Swedish and Scandinavian artists. Skogman was a familiar and popular fixture in Swedish movies, TV and radio shows, opera and stage performances from the 1960s through the 1980s.

Skogman died at a hospital in Gävle in 2007.

Selected discography 
 1959 – Fullträffar (including Penninggaloppen and Storfiskarvalsen)
 1965 – Thore Skogman i skivspåret
 1967 – En sån strålande dag
 1968 – Opp i varv
 1970 – Hesa Fredrik och Pelle Propeller
 1970 – The Old Skogman
 1971 – Dans på Skogmans loge
 1972 – Eva Bysing och Thore Skogman på Berns
 1973 – Led milda ljus
 1973 – Det glada Liseberg
 1975 – Det ska gå med musik
 1980 – Lätt operett
 1985 – Skogmans jul
 1991 – En evig sång
 1997 – Hård-Rock med Thore Skogman
 2001 – Ljudblommor
 2008 – Thore goes Metal

Filmography 
 1963 – Tre dar i buren
 1964 – Tre dar på luffen
 1965 – Pang i bygget
 1967 – Hemma hos Thore
 1967 – En sån strålande dag
 1968 – Mannen som ikke kunne le

Selected soundtrack 
 1963 – Tre dar i buren
 1964 – Tre dar på luffen
 1965 – Pang i bygget
 1967 – En sån strålande dag
 1977 – 91:an och generalernas fnatt
 2001 – Rundt om Rundrejsen 2001
 2001 – Linie 3 – Rundrejsen 2001

Well-known songs by Skogman 
 Ensam jag är (I am lonely)
 Surströmmingspolka (Sour herring polka)
 Tiotusen röda rosor (10,000 red roses)
 Du är en riktig klippare du (You are truly a smart guy)
 Dra ända in i Hälsingland (Go all the way into Hälsingland)
 Penninggaloppen (The money gallop)
 Storfiskarvalsen (The waltz of the great fisher)
 Pop opp i topp (Pop up the top)
 Fröken Fräken (Miss Freckles)
 Twist till menuett (Twist to menuet)
 Kalle Västman från Västmanland (Kalle Västman from Västmanland)
 Min soliga dag (My sunny day)
 Tänk om jag kunde spela dragspel som Calle Jularbo (What if I could play the accordion like Calle Jularbo)
 Gammal kärlek rostar aldrig (Old flames die hard)
 Skinnrock från Malung (Leather jacket from Malung)
 Rött hår och glest mellan tänderna (Redhead with widely spaced teeth)
 Plättlaggen (The pancake pan)
 Även bland törnen finns det rosor (There are roses even among the thorns)

References

External links

Thore Skogman, official website
Thore Skogman – Biography
Interview with Thore Skogman
Wiggen A humorous YouTube made from the recording of Skogman singing The Polka by Wigg.

1931 births
2007 deaths
Swedish entertainers
Swedish male composers
Swedish male film actors
People from Hallstahammar Municipality
20th-century Swedish male singers